Catherine Ferguson may refer to:

Catherine Ferguson Academy, Detroit Public School
Catherine Ferguson (educator), American educator who was born a slave
Cathy Ferguson, American swimmer
Kate Lee Ferguson, American writer
Kit Coleman, Canadian newspaper columnist